Bobby Zothansanga (born 25 August 1986) is an Indian cricketer. He made his first-class debut for Mizoram in the 2018–19 Ranji Trophy on 14 December 2018. He made his Twenty20 debut for Mizoram in the 2018–19 Syed Mushtaq Ali Trophy on 27 February 2019. He made his List A debut on 24 September 2019, for Mizoram in the 2019–20 Vijay Hazare Trophy.

References

External links
 

1986 births
Living people
Indian cricketers
Mizoram cricketers